Joan Renouf (born 1944) is an international lawn bowler representing Jersey.

Bowls career
Renouf has represented Jersey at two Commonwealth Games; in the triples at the 2010 Commonwealth Games and the triples and fours at the 2018 Commonwealth Games.

In 2007, she won the fours gold medal at the Atlantic Bowls Championships

In 2011, she won a gold medal at the European Bowls Championships in Portugal and two years later in 2013, won a bronze at the same Championships.

References 

1944 births
Living people
Jersey female bowls players
Bowls players at the 2010 Commonwealth Games
Bowls players at the 2018 Commonwealth Games
Bowls European Champions